John I. Nicks (1822 Rhinebeck, Dutchess County, New York – 1897) was an American politician from New York.

Life
He attended the common schools, and then was apprenticed to a tobacconist in Red Hook. He pursued this trade for a time in Brooklyn, and then removed to Ithaca where he was foreman of a large tobacco factory. In 1847, he removed to Elmira, where he opened a tobacco shop and manufactured cigars.

He was a Supervisor (2nd Ward) of the Village of Elmira in 1851, and later a trustee of the village, a member of the Board of Education, and Chief Engineer of the Fire Department. In 1862, he was appointed by President Abraham Lincoln as Tax Assessor for the 27th District of New York, and was removed from office by President Andrew Johnson in August 1866.

Nicks was mayor of Elmira from March 1865 to March 1867; and a member of the New York State Senate (27th D.) from 1867 to 1869, sitting in the 90th, 91st and 92nd New York State Legislatures.

Burial
He was buried at the Woodlawn Cemetery in Elmira.

Sources
 The New York Civil List compiled by Franklin Benjamin Hough, Stephen C. Hutchins and Edgar Albert Werner (1870; pp. 444 and 558)
 Life Sketches of the State Officers, Senators, and Members of the Assembly of the State of New York, in 1867 by S. R. Harlow & H. H. Boone (p. 127ff)
 "Removal of the Assessor of the Twenty-seventh District". The New York Times. August 29, 1866.

External links

1822 births
1897 deaths
19th-century American politicians
Burials at Woodlawn Cemetery (Elmira, New York)
Mayors of Elmira, New York
People from Red Hook, New York
People from Rhinebeck, New York
Politicians from Ithaca, New York
Republican Party New York (state) state senators